The Beach of Lost Children is a 1991 Moroccan-French drama film written and directed by Jillali Ferhati. It was screened in competition at the 48th Venice International Film Festival.

Cast 

 Souad Ferhati as Mina
 Fatima Loukili as Zineb 
 Mohamed Timod as Salam  
 Larbi El Yacoubi as the father

References

External links

1991 films
1991 drama films
French drama films
Moroccan drama films
1990s French films